Lee Ji-ho (born 23 January 1995) is a South Korean swimmer. He competed in the men's 100 metre backstroke event at the 2018 Asian Games, winning the bronze medal. He qualified to represent South Korea at the 2020 Summer Olympics.

Career
In July 2021, he represented South Korea at the 2020 Summer Olympics held in Tokyo, Japan. He competed in the 100m backstroke and 200m backstroke. In the 100m backstroke heats, he did not advance to compete in the semifinal. In the 200m backstroke heats event, he completed at rank 2, allowing him to advance to compete in the semifinal. In the 200m backstroke semifinal event, he completed at rank 11, missing out to compete in the final.

References

External links
 
 

1995 births
Living people
South Korean male backstroke swimmers
Place of birth missing (living people)
Asian Games medalists in swimming
Asian Games bronze medalists for South Korea
Swimmers at the 2018 Asian Games
Medalists at the 2018 Asian Games
Swimmers at the 2020 Summer Olympics
Swimmers from Seoul